Anelosimus elegans is a species of cobweb spiders (Theridiidae). It is found from Mexico to Peru.

References

Theridiidae
Spiders described in 2006
Spiders of Mexico
Spiders of South America